Hellenic Environmental Center S.A. - H.E.C. is a Greek shipping company that deals with  recovery and transportation of oil waste by collecting and treating ships and land units residues. H.E.C. is one of the largest companies within its field globally and has 40 ports worldwide. H.E.C. are the market leader in oil waste treatment and hydrocarbon recovery.. H.E.C is a subsidiary of the Aegean Group.

History
H.E.C. was founded in the year of 2000 by Greek businessman Dimitris  Melissanidis as a pioneering environmental company in Piraeus, Greece. It is established as the leading port reception facilities provider in Greece and provides  services in the ports of Piraeus, Hamburg, Gibraltar, and Valetta.

Fleet
H.E.C. have fleet tankers with capacity from 30.000 DWT for the collection of the oil waste resulting from offshore oil rigs and have fleet of tank trucks for the collection of ship­ generated oil waste by land.

H.E.C. collect and treat 320 thousand tons of oily waste annually and have collected and treated 3 million, tons of oily waste since the company was founded in 2000.

Ports
H.E.C is the first company globally to be fully certified by Lloyds Register for the arrangement and management of port waste facilities with ISO standards. H.E.C has 40 ports globally.

References

Greek companies established in 2000